Naracoopa is a rural locality and village in the local government area of King Island on King Island in Bass Strait, north of Tasmania. The 2016 census determined a population of 62 for the state suburb of Naracoopa.

History
The name has been in use since 1914. Naracoopa is an Aboriginal word for “good”.

Geography
Bass Strait forms the eastern and north-eastern boundaries. All land boundaries are with the locality of Pegarah.

Road infrastructure
The C202 route (Fraser Road / The Esplanade / Forrest Street / Millwood Road) enters from the north-west and runs through to the south before exiting. Route C203 (Pegarah Road) starts at an intersection with C202 and runs west and south until it exits.

References

King Island (Tasmania)
Towns in Tasmania